Nicole Krasinski is a pastry chef and co-owner of State Bird Provisions and cookbook author. Along with State Bird Provisions co-owner and husband Stuart Brioza, she wrote State Bird Provisions: A Cookbook in 2017. 

Krasinski is also the co-owner of The Progress.  Both restaurants are in San Francisco.

Career
In 2004, she and Brioza were hired by Drew Nieporent to run the kitchen at Rubicon, after having worked at was has been described as the “”legendary”” Tapawingo in Ellsworth, Michigan.

The 2015 James Beard Award for best chef in the West was shared by Brioza and Krasinski.

References

Pastry chefs
James Beard Foundation Award winners
American women restaurateurs
American restaurateurs
Year of birth missing (living people)
Living people